Ilya Vladimirovich Tsymbalar (Илья́ Влади́мирович Цымбала́рь; 17 June 1969 – 28 December 2013) was a Ukrainian-Russian professional football player and coach. A midfielder, he represented both Ukraine and Russia on the international level. He primarily played as an attacking midfielder and was known for set-piece ability and technique.

Career
After retiring, Tsymbalar became vice-president of Anzhi Makhachkala, before turning to coach by taking over Spartak's reserve team, moving on to the coaching team of FC Khimki. In 2006, he became head-coach of FC Spartak-MZhK Ryazan, whom he led to promotion to the Russian First Division. In February 2008, he was named as head coach of FC Nizhny Novgorod. In January 2009 he resigned from the club.

Career statistics

International goals

Personal life
His son Oleg Tsimbalar was a professional footballer.

Death
Tsymbalar died from heart disease on 28 December 2013.

Honours

Individual 
CIS Cup top goalscorer: 1995

External links 
 Ilya Tsymbalar on RSSSF-site
 Stats on Odessa Football

References

1969 births
2013 deaths
Footballers from Odesa
Soviet footballers
Russian footballers
Russia international footballers
Ukrainian footballers
Ukraine international footballers
Russian football managers
1994 FIFA World Cup players
UEFA Euro 1996 players
Ukrainian expatriate footballers
Expatriate footballers in Russia
Ukrainian expatriate sportspeople in Russia
Soviet Top League players
Soviet Second League players
Ukrainian Premier League players
Russian Premier League players
Dual internationalists (football)
FC Anzhi Makhachkala players
FC Chornomorets Odesa players
FC Dynamo Odesa players
FC Lokomotiv Moscow players
FC Spartak Moscow players
SKA Odesa players
FC Nizhny Novgorod managers
Ukrainian emigrants to Russia
Association football midfielders